The Improving America's Schools Act of 1994 (IASA) was a major part of the Clinton administration's efforts to reform education.  It was signed in the gymnasium of Framingham High School (MA).  It reauthorized the Elementary and Secondary Education Act of 1965.

It included provisions or reforms for:
 The Title 1 program, providing extra help to disadvantaged students and holding schools accountable for their results at the same level as other students
 Charter schools
 Safe and Drug-free schools
 Eisenhower Professional Development
 Major increases in bilingual and immigrant education funding
 Impact aid
 Education technology and other programs.

Sections of the Law
Title I--Helping Disadvantaged Children Meet High Standards
Title II—Dwight D. Eisenhower Professional Development Program
Title III—Technology For Education
Title IV—Safe And Drug-Free Schools And Communities
Title V--Promoting Equity
Title VI—Innovative Education Program Strategies
Title VII—Bilingual Education, Language Enhancement, And Language Acquisition Programs
Title VIII—Impact Aid
Title IX—Indian, Native Hawaiian, And Alaska Native Education
Title X--Programs Of National Significance
Title XI—Coordinated Services
Title XII—School Facilities Infrastructure Improvement Act
Title XIII—Support And Assistance Programs To Improve Education
Title XIV—General Provisions

External links
 Html Copy of the Improving America's Schools Act of 1994, U.S. Department of Education website
 PDF Copy of the Improving America's Schools Act of 1994, Federal Education Policy History website
 Standards, Assessments and Accountability National Academy of Education

References
 clinton4.nara.gov Clinton Administration Education Agenda
 cwx.prenhall.com Elementary and Secondary Education Act of 1965

103rd United States Congress
United States federal education legislation
1994 in education